Saint Benedict Joseph Labre Parish is a historic Roman Catholic parish church complex in the Diocese of Brooklyn, located at 94-40 118th Street in Richmond Hill, Queens, New York City.

Description
The complex consists of the church, rectory / parsonage, school, and cloister.  The church was designed in 1916 by architect Thomas Henry Poole (1860–1919) and completed in 1919.  It is a large brick Romanesque-style building in the basilican plan.  It features a standing seam copper-roofed dome and a bell tower.  The rectory is a -story brick building built in 1939.  The cloister also dates to 1939 and connects the rectory to the sanctuary.  It features a 1938 statue of the patron Saint Benedict Joseph Labre.  The brick school building was built in 1912 and substantially enlarged in 1938–1939.

It was listed on the National Register of Historic Places in 2007.

Gallery

References

External links
The History of Saint Benedict Joseph Labre Parish in Richmond Hill

Roman Catholic churches in Queens, New York
Thomas Henry Poole buildings
Properties of religious function on the National Register of Historic Places in Brooklyn
Romanesque Revival church buildings in New York City
Roman Catholic churches completed in 1916
Richmond Hill, Queens
National Register of Historic Places in Queens, New York
Churches on the National Register of Historic Places in New York (state)
20th-century Roman Catholic church buildings in the United States